Robert A. Phillips is a Canadian scientist, with a long-term interest in cancer research, and special interests in blood cell development and in retinoblastoma, an inherited eye tumour in children. His expertise has spanned the breadth of disciplines including radiation biology, cellular and molecular biology, immunology and molecular genetics.

He has been a tireless ambassador for cancer research and cancer control throughout a career that has spanned more than 3 decades. He is a key member of a band of veteran scientists, also including John Evans, the founding dean of faculty of health sciences at McMaster University and former president of the University of Toronto and Cal Stiller, an organ transplant expert and entrepreneur, who pushed for years for the creation of the Ontario Institute for Cancer Research (OICR), an independent, not-for-profit corporation established in December 2005, and funded by the Government of Ontario through the Ministry of Research and Innovation.

He has been a member of various Boards of Directors, including the Canadian Cancer Society, the Canadian Network for Vaccines and Immunotherapeutics (CANVAC), the Canadian Prostate Cancer Research Foundation, and Partners in Research.

Career
Phillips  received his B.A. in chemistry and zoology from Carleton College in Northfield, Minnesota, and his Ph.D. in molecular biology from Washington University in St. Louis, Missouri.

In 1965, he moved to Toronto to do postdoctoral work with James Till at the Ontario Cancer Institute/Princess Margaret Hospital. He had an independent research career there until 1986.

He was also a faculty member in the Department of Medical Biophysics at the University of Toronto and was Chair of that Department from 1981 to 1986.

In 1986, Phillips moved his research group to the Hospital for Sick Children where he became Director of the Division of Immunology and Cancer Research.

In 1996, Phillips gave up laboratory research to become the Executive Director of the National Cancer Institute of Canada (NCIC). At NCIC, he was instrumental in widening the scope of cancer research that was funded and bringing together different organizations under common mandates.

In 1997, Phillips was one of the initial members of the Board of Directors of the Canadian Foundation for Innovation (CFI).

In January 2002, Phillips became the founding president and CEO of the Ontario Cancer Research Network, a non-profit organization established to speed up the development and testing of promising new cancer therapies.

As of 2007, Phillips is the Chief Operating Officer of the Ontario Institute for Cancer Research, which merged with the Ontario Cancer Research Network in late 2005.

Honours
2003, awarded the R. M. Taylor Medal and Award of the National Cancer Institute of Canada and the Canadian Cancer Society.

External links
 Staff, Ontario Institute for Cancer Research
 
 Canadian Cancer Society

Canadian medical researchers
Cancer researchers
Living people
Year of birth missing (living people)